Zarina Baloch (29 December 1930 – 25 October 2005) was a Pakistani folk music singer, vocalist and composer. She was also an actress, Radio and TV artist, writer, teacher for over 30 years, political activist and social worker.

Early life and family
She was born on 29 December 1930 in Allahdad Chand Village, Hyderabad, Sindh, Pakistan
her mother, Gulroz Jalalani, died in 1940 when Zarina was six years old. She studied with Mohammad Juman, who was also a Sindhi singer. At early age 15 years, her family arranged her marriage with a remote relative. She had two children: Akhter Baloch also known as Zina (born in 1952), and Aslam Parvez (born in 1957). However, Baloch and her husband disagreed on the subject of her further education and the pair were separated in 1958. Baloch joined Radio Hyderabad in 1960 and received her first Music Award in 1961. Then Zarina married Sindhi politician Rasool Bux Palijo, their marriage took place in Hyderabad on 22 September 1964 and they had a son, Ayaz Latif Palijo. In 1967, she became a teacher at the Model School Sindh University. She retired in 1997 and died in 2005 of Brain Cancer in Liaquat National Hospital.

Imprisonment and political activism
In 1979, Zarina was arrested and imprisoned in Sukkur and Karachi jails for leading the protests against President General Zia ul Haq's Martial Law. Because of her struggle against the ruling classes and against gender discrimination, feudalism and martial laws of Ayub Khan and Yahya Khan, she earned the title of JeeJee (mother) of the Sindhi people. She was one of the leading founders of Sindhiani Tahreek, Women's Action Forum, Sindhi Adabi Sangat and Sindhi Haree Committee. She was fluent in Sindhi, Urdu, Seraiki, Balochi, Persian, Arabic and Gujrati.

Awards and recognition
Pride of Performance Award by the President of Pakistan in 1994
Faiz Ahmed Faiz Award
Pakistan Television Corporation (PTV) Award
Lal Shahbaz Qalandar Award
Shah Abdul Latif Bhittai Award

Art and literary contributions
She wrote many songs and poetry which became popular among the nationalists in Sindh and Balochistan. She was the author of several stories and poems, and her Book "Tunhinjee Gola Tunhinjoon Galhion" was published in 1992.

Famous songs
 Mor Tho Tilley Rana
 Sabhka Moomal Sabbko Raarno
 Tunhnjii Yaarii
 Sindhri tey sir ker na dendo
 Kaang Lanvain
 Guzrii Vaii Barsaat
 Bbii Khabar Na Aahai Par
 Kiin Karyaan Maan 	
 Jjariyan Bhar Jaaiyoon	
 Saavak Rat main Saanvara	
 Paee Yaad Aaya	
 Gehraa Gehraa Nairn

See also
 List of Sindhi singers
 Rasul Bux Palejo
 Ayaz Latif Palijo
 Sassui Palijo

References

External links
 Profile of Zarina Baloch (archived)

1934 births
2005 deaths
Baloch people
Pakistani folk singers
Pakistani human rights activists
Sindhi people
Pakistani feminists
Pakistani socialists
Recipients of the Pride of Performance
Recipients of Latif Award
20th-century Pakistani women singers
Sindhi-language singers
Singers from Sindh
People from Hyderabad, Sindh